Electric Mile (2001) is the fifth album by G. Love & Special Sauce, released in 2001.

Track listing
All tracks by G. Love except where noted.

"Unified" (G. Love, RAS) – 3:07
"Praise Up" – 3:43
"Night of the Living Dead" (Jeff Clemens) – 4:36
"Parasite" (G. Love, Jimmy Prescott, Jasper Thomas) – 6:17
"Hopeless Case" – 3:43
"Free at Last" (G. Love, Prescott) – 2:22
"Shy Girl" – 3:32
"Rain Jam" – 1:04
"Electric Mile" – 3:40
"Sara's Song" – 4:59
"100 Magic Rings" – 3:52
"Poison" – 4:19
"Free at Last (Reprise)" (G. Love, Prescott) – 5:55

Personnel 
Garrett Dutton – guitar, vocals, harmonica
Jeffrey "Houseman" Clemens – percussion, drums, backing vocals
Jimi "Jazz" Prescott – string bass
Alma – vocals
 Arty – viola
 Hoch – Cello
 Dave Geller – Congas
Jamie Janover – percussion, dulcimer
John Medeski – organ, keyboards, Fender Rhodes, Wurlitzer, clavenette
Jasper Thomas – vocals 
Billy Conway – percussion
Nancy Falkow – backing vocals
 Little Frankie – lap steel
Technical
Michael Barbiero – producer, mixing, assistant producer
Greg Calbi – mastering
Chris DiBeneditto – producer, mixing
Sean Murphy – photography
Thomas Smith – photography
Special Sauce – producer

References

External links
G. Love & Special Sauce Official site

G. Love & Special Sauce albums
2001 albums